Barika District is a district of Batna Province, Algeria.

Municipalities
The district is further divided into three municipalities.
Barika
Bitam
M'Doukal

Districts of Batna Province